Kalutara Park SC is a Sri Lankan football club based in Kalutara in the Kalutara District.

The team plays in Sri Lanka Premier League the top division of Sri Lankan football.

League participations
Sri Lankan Premier League: 2010–2011, 2013–
Kit Premier League Division I: 2011–2012

Stadium
Currently the team plays at the 15000 capacity Kalutara Stadium.

Honours
Kit Premier League Division I
Champions (1): 2011–12

See also
Sri Lanka Football Premier League
List of top-division football clubs in AFC countries

External links
 Soccerway Profile
 
 Sports.opera

Football clubs in Sri Lanka
Kalutara Park SC